Manc or MANC may refer to:

 Something pertaining to the city of Manchester, in North West England
 The Manchester dialect, or Manc accent, spoken in Manchester and outlying areas
 A derogatory term for either Manchester City F.C. or Manchester United F.C.
 ManC (magazine), a magazine about Manchester City F.C.
 The Manc, the people's voice of Greater Manchester (Manchester-based news publisher)
The MidAmerica Nazarene University, sometimes abbreviated to MANC
The Cameroonian National Action Movement, known by its French acronym MANC
An Istanbul based designer accessories brand mainly focusing on leather goods.

See also 
 Mancunian (disambiguation)
 Mank, a 2020 American biographical drama film about screenwriter Herman J. Mankiewicz
 Mank (town), a town in Austria